A referendum on the citizenship law was held in San Marino on 12 September 1999. Voters were asked whether the new citizenship law passed on 16 June should come into force. Although a majority voted in favour, the quorum of 32% of registered voters (9,663) was not achieved and the referendum failed.

Results

References

San Marino
Referendums in San Marino
Citizenship
San Marino